IntraCorp was a Miami, Florida-based game publisher, founded in 1984. The company went bankrupt in 1996 and shut down along with their main subsidiary, Capstone Software. IntraCorp developed and published games across a variety of genres.

Their last game, Fate, was never released; in 1996 there was only a demo version with four playable levels. IntraCorp was also due to publish a near-complete English translation of Princess Maker 2 developed by SoftEgg, which was later leaked online.

Published games
 Wall $treet Raider (1989)
 Grandmaster Chess (1993)
 Corridor 7: Alien Invasion (1994)
 William Shatner's TekWar (1995)
 Witchaven (1995)
 Chronomaster (1995)
 Witchaven II: Blood Vengeance (1996)

Cancelled projects
 Blood Hockey
 Corridor 8: Galactic Wars
 Fate
 Hammer's Slammers
 Soulkeeper/Crystal Skulls
 V For Victory II: The Pacific Campaign

Defunct video game companies of the United States